Simon Hendrik "Sim" Visser (3 January 1908, Eierland – 13 April 1983, Den Helder) was a Dutch politician.

Sources

Ir. S.H. (Sim) Visser at www.parlement.com.
Biography in the Biografisch Woordenboek van Nederland (Dutch

1908 births
1983 deaths
People from Texel
People's Party for Freedom and Democracy politicians
Ministers of Defence of the Netherlands
Mayors in North Holland
Wageningen University and Research alumni